The Lighthouse of Cabo de São Vicente is beacon/lighthouse located along the coastal peninsula of Sagres Point in the civil parish of Sagres, in the Portuguese municipality of the Vila do Bispo. Not to be confused with the Lighthouse of Ponta de Sagres, which is the located further to the edge of the extreme southwest cape of the civil parish, southwest of the Fortress of Sagres.

History

A rudimentary lighthouse existed on the cape since 1520, in a special tower constructed on the site of the convent. Between 1521 and 1557 a tower was ordered constructed by King D. John III to defend the coast from attacks from marauding soldiers. Yet, in 1587, the tower was destroyed by the English privateer Francis Drake, and only returned to operation in 1606, following its restoration by order of King Phillip II.

The lighthouse of Cape St. Vincente, or the Lighthouse of D. Fernando, was ordered constructed by Queen D. Maria II, and began operating in October 1846, in the 16th century Franciscan convent.

Following an initial period of operation, the lighthouse was abandoned and almost fell into ruin; a survey of the site indicated its deplorable state by 1865. Due to its state and poor performance of its light, work began on remodelling the structure began in 1897. The tower was increased , and its optic was substituted with a new mechanism. Work on the site lasted 11 years, and in 1908 the lighthouse began operating with a  Fresnel lens, making it one of the largest optics used in Portuguese lighthouses and one of the 10 largest in the world. The original beacon installed had a constant five rotations, but was replaced by an incandescent gas lamp.

In 1914, a signal horn was installed. In 1926, a generator was installed, permitting an easy transition from petrol to electricity.

Due to the necessities of the Second World War, in 1947 deflector panels were installed, allowing the lighthouse to function both for terrestrial and maritime navigation. The following year, it was finally connected to the public electrical grid.

In 1982 the lighthouse was automated and, at the same time, it began to control the neighbouring lighthouse in the adjacent cape, supporting a small staff on duty. Following the remodeling in 1990, the optic's rotation was automated 2001.

Architecture

The traditional land's end of Europe, the extreme southwesternmost point on the continent, it was an essential landfall for sailors returning from Africa and the Americas.

The  round cylindrical stone tower, with lantern and gallery, rises from a 2-/3-story keeper's complex. The unpainted lighthouse tower includes red-painted lantern and the keeper's white-painted house with red roof. A fog horn has given two 5-second blasts every 30 seconds.

Its position at land's end attracts visitors annually, and the Portuguese navy constructed a visitor center and museum on the site. The lighthouse and museum open are open to the public on Wednesday afternoons.

See also
 Cape St. Vincent
 Lighthouse of Ponta de Sagres
 List of lighthouses in Portugal

References

Notes

Sources
 
 
 
 
 
 
 
 
 
 
 
 

Cabo Sao Vicente
Buildings and structures in Faro District